The 1990 Men's Hockey World Cup was the seventh edition of the Hockey World Cup, the quadrennial world championship for men's national field hockey teams organized by the FIH. It was held in the National Hockey Stadium in Lahore, Pakistan from 12 to 23 February 1990.

The Netherlands defeated, the hosts, Pakistan 3–1 in the final, with Australia beating out West Germany for third place in extra time, 2–1.

Qualification

Umpires

S Eldine Ahmed (EGY)
Shafat Baghdadi (PAK)
Khizar Bajwa (PAK)
Amarjit Bawa (IND)
Adriano de Vecchi (ITA)
Santiago Deo (ESP)
Amjarit Dhak (KEN)
K O'Connor (CAN)
Don Prior (AUS)
Alain Renaud (FRA)
Eduardo Ruiz (ARG)
Iwo Sakaida (JPN)
Claude Seidler (FRG)
Nikolai Stepanov (URS)
Patrick van Beneden (BEL)
Peter von Reth (NED)
Roger Webb (ENG)

Squads

Group stage

Pool A

Pool B

Classification round

Ninth to twelfth place classification

Cross-overs

Eleventh and twelfth place

Ninth and tenth place

Fifth to eighth place classification

Cross-overs

Seventh and eighth place

Fifth and sixth place

First to fourth place classification

Semi-finals

Third and fourth place

Final

Statistics

Final standings

Goalscorers

References

External links
Official FIH website

 
Men's Hockey World Cup
World Cup
International field hockey competitions hosted by Pakistan
Hockey World Cup Men
Hockey World Cup Men
Sport in Lahore
20th century in Lahore